Riding High is a Canadian music television program which aired on CBC Television in 1955.

Premise
This Vancouver-produced program was set in a different locale in each episode, such as a historic music hall or a western saloon.

Broadcast
This half-hour program was broadcast on Fridays at 9:00 p.m. (Eastern time) from 18 November to 30 December 1955.

References

External links
 
 

CBC Television original programming
1950s Canadian music television series
1955 Canadian television series debuts
1955 Canadian television series endings
Black-and-white Canadian television shows